
 

Keppoch (formerly Cockatoo Lake and Keppach) is a locality in the Australian state of South Australia located in the state's south-east within the Limestone Coast region about  south east of the state capital of Adelaide and about  north-east of the municipal seat of Naracoorte. 

Keppoch started as a town surveyed in 1870 with a proposed name of Cockatoo Lake, but it was given the name of ‘Keppoch’ “after a village in Argyll, Scotland” by Governor Fergusson.  However, this name was misspelt as 'Keppach'.  It was officially renamed in 1938 under the Crown Lands Act 1929 via proclamation as the “Town of Keppoch” on the basis that “the name, which is of Scottish origin, was incorrectly spelt.”  A school opened with the name "Keppach" which was changed to "Keppoch" in 1942 and which was closed in 1951.  Boundaries were created in April 2001 for the locality which include the extent of the government town of Keppoch. 

The majority land use within the locality is primary production.  A parcel of land at the locality's western end was proclaimed in 1977 as a protected area known as the Talapar Conservation Park.

Keppoch is located within the federal division of Barker, the state electoral district of MacKillop and the local government area of the Naracoorte Lucindale Council.

References

Towns in South Australia
Limestone Coast